This is the list of all programming currently or has aired on the state-owned Bangladesh Television.

Domestic

International 
 A Disney Christmas Gift
 Akbar The Great
 Amazon
 Alif Laila
 Babar
 Barney & Friends
 Brum
 Bananas in Pyjamas
 Beethoven
 Bionic Six
 Captain Planet and the Planeteers
 Care Bears
 Charlie Chaplin
 Dallas
 Dark Justice
 Earth: Final Conflict
 Faerie Tale Theatre
 Family Ties
 Feluda
 Godzilla: The Series
 Hatim
 Hawaii Five-O
 Hercules: The Legendary Journeys
 Honey, I Shrunk the Kids
 Knight Rider
 Kung Fu
 Lois & Clark: The New Adventures of Superman
 Looney Tunes
 MacGyver
 Miami Vice
 Mysterious Island
 Mortal Kombat: Conquest
 Mowgli: The New Adventures of the Jungle Book
 Mr. Bean
 Oshin
 Ocean Girl
 Perfect Strangers
 Peter Pan
 Raven
 Ripley's Believe It or Not! (2000-03)
 RoboCop: The Series
 Saber Rider and the Star Sheriffs
 Samurai X
 Sky Trackers
 Spellbinder
 Spenser: For Hire
 Tales of the Gold Monkey
 Team Knight Rider
 Teenage Mutant Ninja Turtles
 The A-Team
 The Adventures of Sinbad
 The Bill Cosby Show
 The Bionic Woman
 The Crystal Maze
 The Equalizer (TV series)
 The Fall Guy
 The Girl from Tomorrow
 The Lost World
 The Miraculous Mellops
 The New Adventures of Jonny Quest
 The New Adventures of Robin Hood
 The New Woody Woodpecker Show
 The Real Ghostbusters
 The Smurfs
 The Three Stooges
 The Twilight Zone
 The Sensitive Samurai (Ude ni oboe ari)
 The Sword of Tipu Sultan
 The Wizard
 The X-Files
 Thunder Cats
 Thunder in Paradise
 Time Trax
 Tom and Jerry
 Twin Peaks
 Woody Woodpecker
 The Six Million Dollar Man
 The Wild Wild West
 The Saint
 WWE Afterburn

References 

Bangladesh Television
Bangladeshi television-related lists
Lists of television series by network